Tighten Up may refer to:

 Tighten Up (Archie Bell & the Drells album), 1968 album
 "Tighten Up" (Archie Bell & the Drells song), the album's title song
 Tighten Up, a 1968 album by Benny Gordon and the Soul Brothers
 "Tighten Up" (Electronic song), a 1991 song
 "Tighten Up" (The Black Keys song), a 2010 song
 Tighten Up, a 1960s series of reggae compilation albums issued by Trojan Records

See also
 Tighten Up Vol. 88, an album by Big Audio Dynamite